Siddharthnagar district is one of the 75 districts of the Indian state of Uttar Pradesh. Siddharthnagar is the district headquarters. Siddharthnagar district is a part of Basti division. It was under Kosala kingdom and also the Shakya Kingdom in ancient times.

Kalanamak rice is notable rice of Siddharthnagar, it is one of the finest and highest selling price rice. Presently its market selling price is 12000 rupee per quintal. Kalanamak rice farming boost the local economy which expended to 5000 hectare. Now Kalanamak rice is categorised under ODOP scheme.

Administrative divisions

Tehsils
Siddharthnagar district comprises five tehsils or sub-divisions each headed by a Sub-Divisional Magistrate (SDM):
Naugarh
Bansi
Domariyaganj
Itwa
Shohratgarh

Blocks
These Tehsils are further divided into 14 Blocks, each headed by a Block Development Officer (BDO):
 Naugarh
 Barhani Bazar
 Shohratgarh
 Birdpur
 Jogia
 Uska Bazar
 Bansi
 Methwal
 Khesraha
 Bhanwapur
 Itwa
 Khuniyaon
 Domariaganj
 Lotan

Demographics

Religion

According to the 2011 census, Siddharthnagar district has a population of 2,559,297, roughly equal to the nation of Kuwait or the US state of Nevada. This gives it a ranking of 164th in India (out of a total of 640). Its population growth rate over the decade 2001-2011 was 25.17%. Siddharthnagar has a sex ratio of 970 females for every 1000 males, and a literacy rate of 67.81%. Scheduled Castes and Scheduled Tribes made up 15.97% and 0.47% of the population respectively.

Languages

At the time of the 2011 Census of India, 80.51% of the population in the district spoke Hindi, 10.06% Bhojpuri, 4.73% Urdu and 4.61% Awadhi as their first language.

The minority population is about 27% of the total population of the district. Siddharthnagar is a category "A" district; that is, it has socio-economic and basic amenities parameters below the national average.

History
Some scholars have suggested that modern-day Piprahwa-Ganwaria was the site of the ancient city of Kapilavastu, the capital of the Shakya kingdom, where Siddhartha Gautama spent the first 29 years of his life, referring to Buddhist texts such as the Pāli Canon.

Chetia Estate
Chetia Estate or riyasat of Chetia is a zamindari of Tripathi Brahmins, their seat was at Chetia, village in Siddharthnagar, constitute many villages.

Geography
Siddharthnagar district lies between 27°N to 27°28'N and 82°45'E to 83°10'E. It is part of Purvanchal. The district borders Nepal's Kapilvastu district on the north and Rupandehi district on the northeast. Otherwise, it is surrounded by other districts of Uttar Pradesh: Maharajganj on the east, Basti and Sant Kabir Nagar on the south, and Balrampur on the west. Siddharthnagar's area is 2,895 km2.

Economy
In 2006, the Ministry of Panchayati Raj named Siddharthnagar one of the country's 250 most backward districts (out of a total of 640). It is one of the 34 districts in Uttar Pradesh currently receiving funds from the Backward Regions Grant Fund Programme (BRGF).

Education

University and Colleges
Siddharth University is a state university in Kapilvastu, Siddharthnagar, Uttar Pradesh.
Madhav Prasad Tripathi Medical College and Hospital, a government medical college in Siddharthnagar.

Notable people
Notable people from the district include:
Kazi Jalil Abbasi, former minister of UP Government, former MLA of Domariyaganj Assembly constituency and former MP Domariyaganj (Lok Sabha constituency).
Jagdambika Pal, former chief minister of UP Government and current Member of Parliament for Domariyaganj (Lok Sabha constituency).
Mata Prasad Pandey, former speaker of UP Assembly MLA for Itwa.
Brij Bhushan Tiwari, former MP Domariyaganj (Lok Sabha constituency).
Mohammed Muqueem, former MP Domariyaganj (Lok Sabha constituency) and former MLA Itwa Assembly constituency.
Jai Pratap Singh, Former Minister of Health Uttar Pradesh MLA for Bansi Assembly constituency.
Satish Chandra Dwivedi, Minister of state (Independent charge) MLA for Itwa.
Shyam Dhani, MLA Kapilvastu.
Amar Singh Chaudhary, MLA Shohratgarh.
Raghvendra Pratap Singh, MLA Domariyaganj.
Keshav Dev Malviya, Father of Indian petroleum industry.
Yogendra Singh, Sociologist
Saiyada Khatoon, MLA Domariyaganj.

References

External links
 

 
Districts of Uttar Pradesh